Robert Julian Ivey (born August 3, 1995) is an American politician serving as a member of the Maryland House of Delegates from District 47A in Prince George's County.

Early life and education
Ivey was born in Prince George's County, Maryland, to Glenn and Jolene Ivey in 1995. His father had held the countywide office of state's attorney and his mother currently serves on the Prince George's County Council. As a sixth grader, Ivey starred in the Broadway production of The Lion King, singing and dancing in the role of young Simba. He graduated from Eleanor Roosevelt High School in 2013. In 2018, he received a Bachelor of Arts degree in political science from the University of Maryland, College Park, where he was a member of the campus' NAACP chapter and led protests over campus police tactics and campus racism.

Career 
During the 2016 presidential campaign, Ivey was elected to and attended the 2016 Democratic National Convention as a delegate for Bernie Sanders, and supported Hillary Clinton after she was nominated as candidate by the Democratic Party.

In May 2017, Ivey was elected to the Cheverly town council. During his first year on the town council, he introduced and passed legislation to designate the town a sanctuary city.

In 2018, Ivey ran for the Maryland House of Delegates in District 47A, challenging incumbent state delegate Jimmy Tarlau. During the primary, he received endorsements from state senator Victor R. Ramirez, the local Service Employees International Union, and state comptroller Peter Franchot.

During the 2018 gubernatorial primary, Ivey campaigned for former NAACP president Ben Jealous. In May 2018, Ivey accused Jealous of trying to keep him off the Democratic primary ballot to improve his own chances and those of Tarlau, who endorsed Jealous' gubernatorial campaign. Jealous denied Ivey's claims, sharing text messages between him and Ivey where he supported Ivey's campaign.

Ivey defeated Tarlau in the Democratic primary in June, placing second behind incumbent state delegate Diana M. Fennell with 32.5 percent of the vote to Tarlau's 29.6 percent. He was unopposed in the general election.

In the legislature
Ivey was sworn into the Maryland House of Delegates on January 9, 2019. He was assigned to the House Ways and Means Committee and serves on its Financial Resources and Local Revenues subcommittees. Ivey is a member of the Legislative Black Caucus of Maryland. Media outlets have described Ivey as a progressive. As of 2022, he is the youngest member of the Maryland General Assembly.

In January 2020, Ivey was elected vice chair of the Prince George's County Delegation. In January 2023, Speaker of the Maryland House of Delegates Adrienne A. Jones appointed Ivey Deputy Majority Whip, as well as Vice-Chair of the Public Safety & Administration Subcommittee of the Appropriations Committee.

Ivey was campaign manager for his father Glenn Ivey's successful 2022 bid for the Democratic nomination to represent Maryland's 4th congressional district in the United States House of Representatives.

Political positions

Criminal justice
In June 2020, Ivey started a petition calling on leaders of the Maryland General Assembly and governor Larry Hogan to reconvene for a special legislative session on the COVID-19 pandemic, evictions, and police brutality. For each day following the petition, Ivey posted tweets highlighting victims of police brutality. The legislative leaders rejected calls to form a special session, but convened workgroups on creating legislation on issues including police reform. In September, Ivey wrote an op-ed for The Washington Post that again called for a special legislative session. House Majority Leader Eric Luedtke rebuked the op-ed in an internal memo, calling it "tremendously disrespectful to the Speaker of the House" to push for a special session in the press without first checking in with Jones and other colleagues.

Also in June 2020, Ivey co-signed a letter penned by Speaker Jones that called on Hogan to enact reforms surrounding police use of force policies in the state.

During the 2021 legislative session, Ivey introduced legislation that would require all Maryland law enforcement agencies to issue body-worn cameras to all on-duty officers by 2022.

Education
During the 2021 legislative session, Ivey introduced legislation to abolish the appointed members of the Prince George's County Board of Education. The bill died without a vote.

Elections
During the 2021 legislative session, Ivey introduced legislation that would automatically send out mail-in ballots to all registered voters.

Taxes
During the 2022 legislative session, Ivey introduced legislation that would exempt diabetic care products from the sales and use tax. The bill passed and became law on April 1, 2022.

Electoral history

References

External links

Democratic Party members of the Maryland House of Delegates
African-American state legislators in Maryland
Living people
University of Maryland, College Park alumni
21st-century American politicians
1995 births
21st-century African-American politicians